The Civil War: A Narrative (1958–1974) is a three volume, 2,968-page, 1.2 million-word history of the American Civil War by Shelby Foote. Although previously known as a novelist, Foote is most famous for this non-fictional narrative history. While it touches on political and social themes, the main thrust of the work is military history. The individual volumes include Fort Sumter to Perryville (1958), Fredericksburg to Meridian (1963), and Red River to Appomattox (1974).

Writing
On the strength of his novel Shiloh, Random House asked Foote for a short Civil War history. Foote soon realized that the project would require much more time and energy, and therefore offered to write a comprehensive narrative history of the war. Random House agreed, and using the money from his 1955 Guggenheim Fellowship (Foote won Guggenheims also in 1956 and 1959.) Foote set out to write the trilogy's first volume, Fort Sumter to Perryville. This 400,000-word account was published in 1958. By 1963 Foote had finished the second volume, Fredericksburg to Meridian.

In 1964 he began Volume 3, Red River to Appomattox, but found himself repeatedly distracted by the ongoing events in the nation and was not able to finish and publish it until 1974. Writing the third volume took as many years as had the first two combined.

Volumes

Fort Sumter to Perryville
The first volume covers the roots of the war to the Battle of Perryville on October 8, 1862. All the significant battles are here, from Bull Run through Shiloh, the Seven Days Battles, Second Bull Run to Antietam, and Perryville in the fall of 1862, but so are the smaller and often equally important engagements on both land and sea: Ball's Bluff, Fort Donelson, Pea Ridge, Island No. Ten, New Orleans, Monitor versus Merrimac, and Stonewall Jackson's Valley Campaign.

Fredericksburg to Meridian
The second volume is dominated by the almost continual confrontation of great armies. The starting point for this volume is the Battle of Fredericksburg, fought on December 13, 1862, between General Robert E. Lee's Army of Northern Virginia and the Army of the Potomac commanded by Maj. Gen. Ambrose E. Burnside. For the fourth time, the Army of the Potomac attempts to take Richmond, resulting in the bloodbath at Fredericksburg. Then Joseph Hooker tries again, only to be repulsed at Chancellorsville as Stonewall Jackson turns his flank, resulting in Jackson's mortal wounding.

In the West, one of the most complex and determined sieges of the war has begun. Here, Ulysses S. Grant's seven relentless efforts against Vicksburg demonstrate Lincoln's and Grant's determination.  With Vicksburg finally under siege, Lee again invades the North. The three-day conflict at Gettysburg receives significant coverage. (The lengthy chapter on Gettysburg has also been published as a separate book, Stars in Their Courses: The Gettysburg Campaign, June–July 1863; his account of Vicksburg was published separately as The Beleaguered City: The Vicksburg Campaign, December 1862 – July 1863.)

Red River to Appomattox
The final volume opens with the beginning of the two final, major confrontations of the war: Grant against Lee in Virginia, and Sherman pressing Johnston in north Georgia in 1864. The narrative describes the events and battles from Sherman's March to the Sea to Lincoln's assassination and the surrender of Lee at Appomattox.

Detailed release information
Original release by Random House:

Vintage Books, a Random House subsidiary, issued the series as trade paperbacks in 1986:

Beginning in 1999, Time–Life published a fourteen volume "40th Anniversary Edition" with contemporary photographs and illustrations, addended with maps originally commissioned for their own 1983-87 comprehensive The Civil War book series. This edition was sold by subscription, but when Time–Life exited the book business, remaindered copies appeared in bookstores. Relatively few copies of volume 13 were printed, increasing the after-market value of that volume and the set as a whole. The divisions were based on keeping each volume to 288–300 pages (a few are shorter or longer), rather than historic or thematic considerations. Each volume has its own index, which appears to be more detailed than the indexes in the three-volume edition. For example, "Rockfish Gap" appears in volume 13 of the Time–Life set, but not in volume 3 of the original edition.

In 2005, Random House published the narratives as nine volumes by splitting the original three into three volumes each. Some of the maps from the original work, hand drawn by Foote, were replaced by more elaborate, full-color maps that originally appeared in the Time-Life Civil War history series. Photographs and artwork were also added.

In 2011, Random House released a new edition of the trilogy, edited by Jon Meacham, along with a companion volume by Meacham entitled American Homer: Reflections on Shelby Foote and His Classic The Civil War: A Narrative:

References

External links
New York State Writers Institute: Shelby Foote
The Mississippi Writer's Page: Shelby Foote

1974 books
History books about the American Civil War
Series of history books